The Colossus may refer to:

 The Colossus (album), by RJD2
 The Colossus (painting), generally attributed to Francisco de Goya
 The Colossus and Other Poems, a poetry collection by Sylvia Plath

See also
Colossus (disambiguation)
The Colossus of New York